Jay J. Armes (born Julian Armas; August 12, 1932) is an American private investigator and actor. He is known for his prosthetic hands and a line of children's action figures based on his image.

Early life and education
Armes was born Julian Armas to Mexican-American parents Pedro and Beatriz in Ysleta, a low-income area near El Paso, Texas, now a southeast El Paso neighborhood. His father was a grocer. At the age of eleven, he and his friend Dick Caples, seven years his senior, broke into a Texas & Pacific Railroad section house and stole railway torpedoes. Armes rubbed two torpedo sticks together, detonating them and causing the mangling of both hands. Caples, who was standing nearby, was not injured. Armes was taken to Hotel Dieu Hospital in El Paso, where his hands were amputated two inches above both wrists.

Armes went back to school four weeks after the surgery. Before he was fitted with prosthetics, he had a German Shepherd service dog named Butch.  In school, he continued to play sports and learned to shoot a gun. Armes graduated Ysleta High School at the age of fifteen. Armes earned his degrees in criminology and psychology from New York University through correspondence courses.

Career
Armes had a contract to work with Twentieth Century Fox in Hollywood from 1949 to 1955. While Armes claims to have appeared in 39 movies and 28 television shows, the only verifiable appearance is an episode of Hawaii Five-O.

In 1956 he became the operations director of Goodwill Industries in El Paso, Texas.

In 1958, after briefly working as an actor in California and returning to El Paso, Armes started his private investigative agency, The Investigators. Armes worked with an assistant, James Cheu, and would visit El Paso area high schools to talk about their work. During his time as an investigator, he was involved in a kidnapping case involving the son of Marlon Brando. He collected around $25,000, plus expenses, for that case. He was also allegedly involved in a jailbreak that later inspired the movie Breakout.

Armes ran for office as Justice of Peace in Precinct 2 in El Paso in 1970, but did not make it past the primaries.

In 1978, he launched The Investigators Security Course. Designed as a mobile patrol and security service, this branch of the organization served the community for a number of years until the patrol division was discontinued. Armes has been a certified Peace Officer.

From 1989 to 1993, Armes served on the El Paso City Council. He sought election to the council again in 2001, but was defeated and returned to his investigation business.

Books and toys
In 1976, Armes published his autobiography, Jay J. Armes, Investigator; . In 1976, the Ideal Toy Corp. also launched the Jay J. Armes Toy Line, which featured a Jay J. Armes action figure with detachable prosthetics, various gadgets, and a Mobile Investigation Unit. In 1978, Armes and Ideal Toy Corp. launched an Investigative Course for Children which was introduced to a number of school districts throughout the United States. The same year, Armes authored a comprehensive correspondence-based investigative training course, and founded The Investigators Training Academy.

Television
Armes played the villain in the Hawaii Five-O episode, "Hookman," (11 September 1973). The updated series, Hawaii Five-0, remade the episode with the same scenes and title on 4 February 2013; Peter Weller remade the role and directed the episode.

Armes' rescue of Marlon Brando's son was described on a season 7 episode of the Travel Channel show Mysteries at the Museum.

Personal life 
In the 1960s, Armes had a small private zoo in his home in the North Loop area. He raised German Shepherds, big cats and owned a chimpanzee. Later permits allowed him to keep the dogs and chimpanzee, own a cheetah, cougar, tapir, and several monkeys. Armes learned to drive, fly a jet plane and scuba dive.

He and his wife, Linda Chew, had three children. In September 2020, Armes put his million dollar El Paso estate up for sale.

Awards and recognition
1975: featured in People Magazine as one of "The 25 Most Intriguing People" of the year
1976: received the "Golden Plate Achievement Award"
1977: featured in the Book of Lists
1979: selected as one of forty individuals honored as the "Most Successful Celebrities of America" by the Academy of Achievement in Beverly Hills, California
1981: featured in the book Dreaming and Winning in America
1989: received the "Most Successful Investigator in the Country" Award from the International Society of Private Investigators (ISPI)
1991: featured in the book Watching the detectives : the life and times of the private eyes
1992: honored as a member of the "Who's Who in Leading American Executives"
1994: featured in the Time Life book series, Crimes of Passion, along with son Jay J. Armes III, for their work on an international murder case
1997: featured in "The Hispanic-American Hall of Fame" poster, card set and learning guide
1998: Inducted into Investigator's Hall Of Fame, NAIS and named top ten investigators of the century for 1900s-NAIS. National Association Of Investigative Specialists

References

External links
 

1932 births
Living people
People from El Paso, Texas
Private detectives and investigators
American amputees
El Paso City Council members
American politicians of Mexican descent